Between 2000 and 2009, there were 72 Thor-derived rockets launched, of which 70 were successful, giving a 97.2% success rate.

Notable missions

2001 Mars Odyssey

Mars Exploration Rover A and B (Spirit and Opportunity)

Spitzer Space Telescope

MESSENGER

Dawn

Kepler

Wide-field Infrared Survey Explorer (WISE)

Launch statistics

Rocket configurations

Launch sites

Launch outcomes

Launch history

Images

See also
 List of Atlas launches (2000–09)

References

Lists of Thor and Delta launches
Lists of Delta launches